East Bourke (also known as Bourke East from around 1891) was an electoral district of the Legislative Assembly in the Australian state of Victoria from 1856 until being abolished by the post-Federation Electoral Districts Boundaries Act 1903 coming into effect in 1904.

The district of East Bourke was one of the initial districts of the first Victorian Legislative Assembly, 1856.

Members for East Bourke
Two members initially, one from the redistribution of 1877.

Notes
 = resigned
 = by-election

References

Former electoral districts of Victoria (Australia)
1856 establishments in Australia
1904 disestablishments in Australia